The February 2021 Greek cold wave was a cold wave over Greece, named Cold Front Medea, that arrived on February 13, 2021 and lasted through February 16. The weather resulted in the deaths of at least 3 people.

Affected Areas 
The areas affected by the cold wave were widespread, with the snow reaching coastal areas of mainland Greece and, with some exceptions, on the Aegean Islands, and on Crete. The snowfall in these areas was particularly significant according to the Hellenic National Meteorological Service (HNMS) as these areas rarely see snow. During the cold front, the snow heavily affected the regions of Attica, Boeotia, and Evia, causing damage and complications to infrastructure in those regions.

Impact
Cold Front Medea caused widespread disruptions to sea and road traffic, with debris and weather conditions making certain roads inaccessible, and causing flights and ferries to be canceled or delayed. According to a spokesperson for the Hellenic Fire Service, the service received an increased number of calls about blocked roadways as well as requests from people trapped in their vehicles requesting transport to a safe location. Some vehicles were reportedly abandoned on the closed highways.

The weather also caused power outages in Athens and a number of its suburbs. According to the Hellenic Fire Service, the power outages temporarily halted the administration of COVID-19 vaccines in the Athens area.

Casualties
At least three deaths were attributed to the cold wave. On Euboea, two men with breathing complications died of respiratory arrest after a blackout disabled their breathing equipment. In Kaminaki, on Crete, a farmer in his 60s was found dead, in the snow, next to his granary.

Recorded temperatures
The cold front brought unseasonably cold temperatures, and the coldest day recorded was on February 16.

Gallery

See also
 Weather of 2021

References 

Cold waves in Europe
2021 cold waves
2021 in Greece
February 2021 events in Greece